The 2021–22 USHL season was the 43rd season of the United States Hockey League as an all-junior league.

The Cedar Rapids RoughRiders and Madison Capitols returned from their hiatus for this season. The RoughRiders' absence was due to derecho damage to ImOn Ice Arena, while the Capitols was caused by COVID-19 pandemic restrictions in Madison, Wisconsin.

The regular season ran from September 23, 2021, to May 21, 2022, with a 62-game schedule for each team. The Western Conference champions Tri-City Storm were awarded the Anderson Cup for accumulating 98 points. The Western Conference runners-up Sioux City Musketeers won the Clark Cup playoff championship.

Regular season 
Final standings:

Eastern Conference

Western Conference

x = clinched playoff berth; y = clinched conference title; z = clinched regular season title

Clark Cup playoffs 
Final results:

Postseason awards

USHL awards

All-USHL First Team 

Source

All-USHL Second Team 

Source

All-USHL Third Team 

Source

USHL All-Rookie Team 

Source

All-Rookie Second Team 

Source

References

External links 

 Official website of the United States Hockey League

United States Hockey League seasons
USHL